Tingena melanamma is a species of moth in the family Oecophoridae. It is endemic to New Zealand and has been observed in Marlborough, Otago and Southland.

Taxonomy 

This species was first described by Edward Meyrick in 1905 using specimens collected by J. H. Lewis in Ida Valley, Otago and named Borkhausenia melanamma. In 1915 Meyrick discussed this species under the name Borkhausenia melanamma. In 1926 Alfred Philpott discussed and illustrated the genitalia of the male of this species however the genitalia of the lectotype of this species differs from Philpott's illustration. In 1928 George Hudson also discussed and illustrated this species in his book The butterflies and moths of New Zealand. In 1988 J. S. Dugdale placed this species within the genus Tingena. In the same publication Dugdale synonymised Borkhausenia sabulosa with T. melanamma as the holotype of B. sabulosa and the lectotype of T. melanamma are indistinguishable.  The male lectotype is held at the Natural History Museum, London.

Description 
Meyrick described this species as follows:
This species is very similar in appearance to T. siderodita but has a grey appearance and lacks the ochreous-yellow colouring and the paler hindwings of the latter species.

Distribution 
This species is endemic to New Zealand and has been observed in Otago and Southland. This species has also been observed in coastal habitats in Marlborough.

Behaviour 
Adults of this species are on the wing in December and January. The larvae of this species feed on leaf litter.

References

Oecophoridae
Moths of New Zealand
Moths described in 1905
Endemic fauna of New Zealand
Taxa named by Edward Meyrick
Endemic moths of New Zealand